This is a timeline documenting events of Jazz in the year 1910.

Events
 Violinist, pianist, composer and conductor James Reese Europe founds the Clef Club, an association for Black musicians based in New York.

Standards

Births

 January
 2 – Minoru Matsuya, Japanese pianist (died 1995).
 14 – Jimmy Crawford, American drummer (died 1980).
 23 – Django Reinhardt, Belgian-born, Romani French jazz guitarist and composer (died 1953).
 27 – Charlie Holmes, American alto jazz saxophonist of the swing era (died 1985).

 February
 21 – Al Sears, American tenor saxophonist and bandleader (died 1990).

 March
 6 – Arthur Österwall, Swedish band leader, composer, vocalist, and upright bassist (died 1990).

 April
 1 — Harry Carney, American saxophonist (died 1974).
 16 – Boyce Brown, American dixieland alto saxophonist (died 1959).
 28 – Everett Barksdale, American guitarist (died 1986).

 May
 8 — Mary Lou Williams, African-American pianist, composer, and singer (died 1981).
 12 – Jack Jenney, American jazz trombonist (died 1945).
 23 – Artie Shaw, American clarinetist, composer, bandleader, and actor (died 2004).
 25 – Pha Terrell, American singer (died 1945).
 28 – T-Bone Walker, American guitarist, singer, songwriter and multi-instrumentalist (died 1975).

 June
 7 — Gene Porter American saxophonist and clarinetist (died 1993).
 13 – Eddie Beal, American pianist (died 1984).
 15 – Stan Wrightsman, American pianist (died 1975).
 18 – Ray McKinley, American drummer, singer, and bandleader (died 1995).

 July
 18 – Lou Busch, American pianist, arranger and composer, a.k.a. Joe "Fingers" Carr (died 1979).

 August
 7 — Freddie Slack, American pianist, composer, and bandleader (died 1965).
 8 — Lucky Millinder, African-American bandleader (died 1966).

 September
 12 – Shep Fields, American bandleader, clarinetist, and tenor saxophonist (died 1981).

 October
 10 – Milt Larkin, American trumpeter and bandleader (died 1996).
 24 – Stella Brooks, American singer (died 2002).

 November
 25 – Willie Smith, American saxophonist, clarinetist, and singer (died 1967).

December
 7 — Louis Prima, Italian-American singer, songwriter, bandleader, and trumpeter (died 1978).
 14 – Budd Johnson, American saxophonist and clarinetist (died 1984).
 17 — Sy Oliver, African-American arranger, trumpeter, composer, singer and bandleader (died 1988).
 23 – Freddy Gardner, British saxophonist (died 1950).
 26 – Rupert Nurse, Trinidadian-British pianist, upright bassist, and saxophonist (died 2001).

References

External links
 History Of Jazz Timeline: 1910 at All About Jazz

Jazz by year
Jazz, 1910 In